Holoubek (feminine Holoubková) is a Czech surname meaning literally "little pigeon". Its Slovak equivalent is Holúbek. Notable people include:

 David Holoubek, Czech football manager
 Gustaw Holoubek (1923 – 2008), Polish actor, director, member of the Polish Sejm, and senator
 Joe E. Holoubek (1915 – 2007), American physician and co-founder of Louisiana State University Health Sciences Center Shreveport
 Martina Holoubková, Czech chess player
 Todd Holoubek (born 1969), American film and television actor, comedian, and sketch-comedy writer

Others 
 Holoubek (Little Dove), a ballad in the 1853 collection Kytice by Karel Jaromír Erben
 Holoubek (translated as The Wild Dove), the fourth orchestral poem composed by the Czech composer Antonín Dvořák

Czech-language surnames